Finland competed at the 1988 Summer Olympics in Seoul, South Korea. 78 competitors, 59 men and 19 women, took part in 66 events in 15 sports.

Competitors
The following is the list of number of competitors in the Games.

Medalists

Archery

The Finnish team did not fare as well at the 1988 Olympic archery competition as they had previously, though the men's team was almost able to capture a medal.  Only one archer placed in the top eight in individual competition.

Women's Individual Competition:
 Päivi Aaltonen — 1/8 Final (→ 20th place)
 Jutta Poikolainen — Preliminary Round (→ 55th place)
 Minna Heinonen — Preliminary Round (→ 56th place)

Men's Individual Competition:
 Pentti Vikström — Final (→ 7th place)
 Tomi Poikolainen — Semifinal (→ 11th place)
 Ismo Falck — Preliminary Round (→ 27th place)

Women's Team Competition:
 Aaltonen, Poikolainen, and Heinonen — Preliminary Round (→ 13th place)

Men's Team Competition:
 Vikstrom, Poikolainen, and Falck — Final (→ 4th place)

Athletics

Men's Long Jump 
 Jarmo Kärnä 
 Qualification — 7.90m
 Final — 7.82m (→ 10th place)

Men's Hammer Throw
 Harri Huhtala
 Qualification — 77.34m
 Final — 75.38m (→ 9th place)
 Juha Tiainen
 Qualification — 73.24m (→ did not advance)

Men's Javelin Throw 
 Tapio Korjus 
 Qualification — 81.42m
 Final — 84.28m (→  Gold Medal)
 Seppo Räty 
 Qualification — 81.62m
 Final — 83.26m (→  Bronze Medal)
 Kimmo Kinnunen 
 Qualification — 80.24m
 Final — 78.04m (→ 10th place)

Men's 50 km Walk
 Reima Salonen
 Final — 3'51:36 (→ 18th place)

Men's Decathlon 
 Petri Keskitalo — 8143 points (→ 11th place) 
 100 metres — 10.94s
 Long Jump — 7.56m
 Shot Put — 15.34m
 High Jump — 1.97m
 400 metres — 49.94s
 110m Hurdles — 14.25s
 Discus Throw — 41.86m
 Pole Vault — 4.80m
 Javelin Throw — 66.64m
 1.500 metres — 4:55.89s

Women's Marathon
 Tuija Jousimaa
 Final – 2:43:00 (→ 41st place)
 Sinikka Keskitalo
 Final – 2:43:00 (→ 42nd place)

Women's Javelin Throw
 Päivi Alafrantti
 Qualification – 62.82m
 Final – 58.20m (→ 10th place)
 Tiina Lillak
 Qualification – 60.06m (→ did not advance)
 Tuula Laaksalo
 Qualification – 60.64m (→ did not advance)

Women's Heptathlon 
 Satu Ruotsalainen
 Final Result — 6101 points (→ 15th place)
 Ragne Kytölä
 Final Result — 5686 points (→ 21st place)

Boxing

Canoeing

Cycling

Four cyclists, three men and one woman, represented Finland in 1988.

Men's road race
 Jari Lähde

Men's 1 km time trial
 Mika Hämäläinen

Men's individual pursuit
 Jyrki Tujunen

Women's road race
 Tea Vikstedt-Nyman — 2:00:52 (→ 43rd place)

Diving

Equestrianism

Fencing

One male fencer represented Finland in 1988.

Men's épée
 Lars Winter

Judo

Rowing

Sailing

Shooting

Swimming

Men's 100m Breaststroke
 Petri Suominen
 Heat – 1:03.58
 B-Final – 1:04.04 (→ 14th place)

Men's 200m Breaststroke
 Petri Suominen
 Heat – 2:22.01 (→ did not advance, 29th place)

Weightlifting

Wrestling

References

Nations at the 1988 Summer Olympics
1988
S